Mushir Alam (died 20 February 2019) was an Indian film producer. After a nationally publicized funeral, he was buried in Jajmau. He was known as one of Bollywood's highest-profile and most successful producers of the 70s and 80s. His production shingle was "Mushir-Riaz", a joint venture with fellow producer Mohammed Riaz (died 21 May 2022). He was infamously kidnapped in Mumbai in 1982.

Filmography
 Safar (1970)
 Mehbooba (1976) 
 Bairaag (1976)
 Apne Paraye (1980)
 Rajput (1982)
 Shakti (1982)
 Zabardast (1985)
 Samundar (1986)
 Commando (1988)
 Akayla (1991)
 Virasat (1997)

References

Indian film producers